Sarmathali is a village development committee in Kabhrepalanchok District in the Bagmati Zone of central Nepal. At the time of the 1991 Nepal census it had a population of 1,159 in 234 individual households.

References

External links
UN map of the municipalities of Kavrepalanchowk District

Populated places in Kavrepalanchok District